Matthew James Brown (born 10 March 1972) is an Australian politician, elected as a member of the New South Wales Legislative Assembly for Kiama between 1999 and 2011. He was appointed Minister for Police and Minister for the Illawarra in the New South Wales Government on 8 September 2008 but resigned three days later after allegations of inappropriate conduct at a party in Parliament House occurring in June 2008.

Brown holds a Bachelor of Mathematics and a Bachelor of Laws from the University of Wollongong. Prior to his election he worked as solicitor and as a lecturer at the university.

Political career
Brown was elected as Member for Kiama in 1999, representing the  Labor Party. He was sworn in as Minister for Housing and Tourism on 2 April 2007, and promoted to Minister for Police and Minister for the Illawarra on 8 September 2008. He resigned on 11 September 2008 after being accused of erotic dancing at a late-night party in his Parliament House office. In 2010, he denied these allegations.

Partly due to the fallout from those allegations, Brown was heavily defeated at the 2011 state election by Liberal challenger Gareth Ward, suffering a swing of over 19 percent.

Brown had been suggested to run for the Federal seat of Throsby at the 2013 election but he decided against it.

Brown ran as a candidate for Kiama Council in the 2016 NSW Council Elections. He was elected to council along with his second running mate, Don Watson.

References

 

Members of the New South Wales Legislative Assembly
1972 births
Living people
University of Wollongong alumni
Australian Labor Party members of the Parliament of New South Wales
21st-century Australian politicians